The premier of British Columbia is the first minister for the Canadian province of British Columbia. The province was a British crown colony governed by the governors of British Columbia before joining Canadian Confederation in 1871. Since then, it has had a unicameral Westminster-style parliamentary government, in which the premier is the leader of the party that controls the most seats in the legislative assembly. The premier picks a cabinet from the elected members to form the Executive Council of British Columbia and presides over that body.

Members are first elected to the legislature during general elections. General elections must be conducted every four years from the date of the last election. An election may also take place if the governing party loses the confidence of the legislature by the defeat of a supply bill or tabling of a no-confidence motion.

Before 1903, British Columbia did not use a party system; instead, premiers of British Columbia had no official party affiliation and were chosen by elected members of the legislative assembly from among themselves. Candidates ran as "Government", "Opposition", "Independent", or in formulations such as "Opposition independent", indicating their respective positions to the incumbent regime.

British Columbia has had 35 individuals serve as premier since joining Confederation, of which 14 individuals had no party affiliation, three were Conservatives, eight were Liberals, four were Socreds, and six were New Democrats. The first premier was John Foster McCreight, who was inaugurated in 1871. Joseph Martin spent the shortest time in office, at 106 days. At over twenty years, W. A. C. Bennett spent the longest time in office, and is the only premier to serve in more than four parliaments. The incumbent premier is David Eby, who was sworn in on November 18, 2022.

Premiers of British Columbia

See also

 Leader of the Opposition (British Columbia)
 List of premiers of British Columbia by time in office

Notes

References

General

 

British Columbia

Premiers